Lyaskovets Peak is the easternmost peak of Friesland Ridge in the Tangra Mountains, eastern Livingston Island and has an elevation of 1,473 m. The peak is bounded by Catalunyan Saddle on the west and Shipka Saddle on the east, and is heavily glaciated and crevassed, with precipitous western, southern and eastern slopes. It surmounts Huron Glacier to the northwest and northeast, and Macy Glacier and Brunow Bay area to the south.  Its northern offshoot forms Zograf Peak, and is linked to Lozen Nunatak, Erma Knoll and Aheloy Nunatak in Huron Glacier.

The peak is named after Lyaskovets, a town in central northern Bulgaria.

Location
The feature was mapped by the UK Directorate of Overseas Surveys in 1968, and by Bulgaria in 2005 and 2009.

History
The first ascent of Lyaskovets Peak was made on 14 December 2004 by Lyubomir Ivanov and Doychin Vasilev from Camp Academia (541 m) during the Tangra 2004/05 Survey. Their route (UIAA grade III) started with 4 km of solid but crevassed firn surface ascent up to Catalunyan Saddle (1,260 m) on the main crest of Tangra Mountains, from where they traversed the precipitous west slope of the peak until the north slope was reached, from where the summit – itself split by a crevasse – was easily reached.
 
The second ascent, also by way of Ivanov–Vasilev route, was made by the Bulgarian mountaineers Doychin Boyanov and Nikolay Petkov on 1 January 2015.

See also 
 Bulgarian toponyms in Antarctica

Maps
 Chart of South Shetland including Coronation Island, &c. from the exploration of the sloop Dove in the years 1821 and 1822 by George Powell Commander of the same. Scale ca. 1:200000. London: Laurie, 1822
 South Shetland Islands. Scale 1:200000 topographic map. DOS 610 Sheet W 62 60. Tolworth, UK, 1968.
 Islas Livingston y Decepción.  Mapa topográfico a escala 1:100000.  Madrid: Servicio Geográfico del Ejército, 1991.
 L.L. Ivanov et al., Antarctica: Livingston Island, South Shetland Islands (from English Strait to Morton Strait, with illustrations and ice-cover distribution), 1:100000 scale topographic map, Antarctic Place-names Commission of Bulgaria, Sofia, 2005
 L.L. Ivanov. Antarctica: Livingston Island and Greenwich, Robert, Snow and Smith Islands. Scale 1:120000 topographic map. Troyan: Manfred Wörner Foundation, 2010.  (First edition 2009. )
 Antarctic Digital Database (ADD). Scale 1:250000 topographic map of Antarctica. Scientific Committee on Antarctic Research (SCAR), 1993–2016.
 L.L. Ivanov. Antarctica: Livingston Island and Smith Island. Scale 1:100000 topographic map. Manfred Wörner Foundation, 2017. 
 A. Kamburov and L. Ivanov. Bowles Ridge and Central Tangra Mountains: Livingston Island, Antarctica. Scale 1:25000 map. Sofia: Manfred Wörner Foundation, 2023.

Gallery

Notes

References 
 Lyaskovets Peak. SCAR Composite Antarctic Gazetteer
 Bulgarian Antarctic Gazetteer. Antarctic Place-names Commission. (details in Bulgarian, basic data in English)
 D. Gildea. Mountaineering in Antarctica: complete guide: Travel guide. Primento and Editions Nevicata, 2015.

External links
 Lyaskovets Peak. Copernix satellite image

Mountains of the South Shetland Islands
Tangra Mountains
Bulgaria and the Antarctic